Sandra J. Major (born September 4, 1954) was a member of the Pennsylvania House of Representatives from the 111th District between 1995 and 2017. Prior to her election to the House, she was Susquehanna County Treasurer and district assistant to former Representative Carmel Sirianni.

Career
Major was elected to the leadership position of Republican Caucus Chairwoman for the 2007-08 legislative session.

Personal
Major is a graduate of Mountain View High School and Keystone Junior College.  She also attended the University of Scranton.  She is a member of several organizations, including the Pennsylvania Higher Education Assistance Agency

In 2002, she was named to the PoliticsPA list of Best Dressed Legislators.

Electoral history

References

External links
Representative Sandra Major official web site
PA House profile

1954 births
Living people
Republican Party members of the Pennsylvania House of Representatives
People from Montrose, Pennsylvania
People from Seaford, Delaware
University of Scranton alumni
Women state legislators in Pennsylvania
21st-century American politicians
21st-century American women politicians